Głuchówek  is a village in the administrative district of Gmina Przesmyki, within Siedlce County, Masovian Voivodeship, in east-central Poland.

The village has an approximate population of 200.

References

{{DEFAULTSORT:
Gluchowek, Masovian Voivodeship}}
Villages in Siedlce County